The Saginaw Valley State Cardinals (SVSU Cardinals) are the athletic teams that represent Saginaw Valley State University, located in University Center, Michigan, in NCAA Division II intercollegiate sporting competitions. The Cardinals compete as members of the Great Lakes Intercollegiate Athletic Conference for all 16 varsity sports. The Cardinals have been members of the GLIAC since it was founded in 1972.

Varsity teams

Championships

National championships
 1982 – Men's Indoor Track and Field – NAIA
 1983 – Men's Indoor Track and Field – NAIA
 1989 – Softball – NAIA
 1991 – Men's Bowling – USBC Collegiate
 1997 – Men's Bowling – USBC Collegiate
 2006 – Men's Bowling – USBC Collegiate
 2007 – Men's Bowling – USBC Collegiate
 2009 – Men's Ice Hockey – ACHA Division III
 2010 – Men's Ice Hockey – ACHA Division III

National runners-up
 1977 – Men's Cross Country – NAIA
 1978 – Men's Cross Country – NAIA
 1982 – Men's Cross Country – NAIA
 1983 – Men's Outdoor Track and Field – NAIA
 1984 – Men's Outdoor Track and Field – NAIA
 1984 – Men's Golf – NAIA
 1985 – Women's Basketball – NAIA Division I
 1996 – Men's Bowling – USBC Collegiate
 2004 – Men's Bowling – USBC Collegiate
 2009 – Men's Bowling – USBC Collegiate
 2012 – Men's Soccer – NCAA Division II

Basketball Final Four
 1982 – Women's Basketball – NAIA Division I
 1985 – Women's Basketball – NAIA Division I (Runner-up)

References

External links